El Kurdi is a city in Dakahlia Governorate of Egypt.

References

Populated places in Dakahlia Governorate